Ajay is an Indian actor who works primarily in Telugu and Tamil films.

Personal life

Ajay was born and brought up in Vijayawada. His family later moved to Hyderabad. Ajay married Swetha Ravuri in 2005 who entered the Mrs India Worldwide finals in 2017. The couple has two children.

Filmography

Telugu

Tamil

Kannada

Television

References

External links

Indian male film actors
Living people
Year of birth missing (living people)
Male actors from Vijayawada
Male actors in Tamil cinema
Male actors in Telugu cinema
Male actors in Kannada cinema
21st-century Indian male actors
Male actors from Andhra Pradesh
People from Vijayawada
People from Krishna district